The Thames Water Authority was one of ten regional water authorities created in the UK on 1 April 1974 under the provisions of the Water Act 1973 to bring together all the water management functions of the region in one public body.

Predecessors 

The bodies subsumed by the Thames Water Authority included the Metropolitan Water Board, the Thames Conservancy, the Lee Conservancy Catchment Board and parts of the Essex and Kent River authorities.  It also took over water and sewage responsibility from the following water suppliers in the Thames catchment:

 Colne Valley Water Company
 Cotswold Water Board
 Croydon Corporation
 East Surrey Water Company
 Epsom and Ewell Corporation
 Lee Valley Water Company
 Mid Southern Water Company
 Middle Thames Water Board
 Oxfordshire and District Water Board
 Rickmansworth and Uxbridge Valley Water Company
 South West Suburban Water Company
 Sutton District Water Company
 Swindon Corporation
 Thames Valley Water Board
 Watford Corporation
 West Surrey Water Board
 Woking and District Water Company

Dissolution 

In 1989 the Thames Water Authority was partly privatised, under the provisions of the Water Act 1989 with the water and sewage responsibilities transferring to the newly established publicly quoted company of Thames Water, and the regulatory, land drainage and navigation responsibilities transferring to the newly created National Rivers Authority which later became the Environment Agency.

References 

Water supply and sanitation in England
Defunct companies based in London
Defunct public bodies of the United Kingdom
History of the River Thames
Former water company predecessors of Thames Water
Water management authorities in the United Kingdom
Public utilities established in 1974
1974 establishments in England